Newquay surfing reef was a project in 2011 to build an artificial reef in Newquay, Cornwall, England, UK. It never happened.

Newquay is one of Britain's top surfing locations and the project was aimed at increasing the swell and frequency of the waves to a better world standard for surfing.

See also

Cribbar
Big wave surfing
Osborne Reef
Boscombe Surf Reef

References

Surfing locations in Cornwall
Newquay
Artificial reefs